Piave is an Italian cow's milk cheese that is named after the Piave river. As Piave has a Protected Designation of Origin (Denominazione di Origine Protetta or DOP), the only "official" Piave is produced in the Dolomites area, province of Belluno, in the northernmost tip of the Veneto region.

Piave is a hard, cooked curd cheese, offered at five different ages:

 Piave Fresco (20 to 60 days aging - blue label)
 Piave Mezzano (61 to 180 days aging - blue label)
 Piave Vecchio (more than 6 months aging - blue label)
 Piave Vecchio Selezione Oro (more than 12 months aging - red label)
 Piave Vecchio Riserva (more than 18 months aging - black label)

Piave cheese has a dense texture, without holes, and is straw-yellow in hue. It has a slightly sweet flavor. Once fully aged, it becomes hard enough for grating, and it develops an intense, full-bodied flavor. Piave's rind is impressed repeatedly in vertical direction with the name of the cheese.

Piave is sold throughout Europe and in the US as a hard cheese, at which point its taste resembles that of a young Parmigiano Reggiano. The red label is aged at least one year and is called Vecchio (Piave Vecchio Selezione Oro), while the blue label is softer. Both are available all over Europe and can also be found in the US, primarily at specialty shops.

References

External links
 Official website of Piave Cheese - the Italian producers' consortium

Cheeses of Veneto
Italian cheeses
Cow's-milk cheeses
Italian products with protected designation of origin
Cheeses with designation of origin protected in the European Union